Salif Dianda (born 17 December 1987) is a Burkinabé footballer who plays for ASD Ferentillo-Valnerina as a midfielder.

Biography
Born in Adzopé to Burkinabé parents, Dianda arrived in Italy in 2004. He obtained a temporary resident permit on 10 August 2005 and became eligible to sign win any Italian club in 2006, after one year legal residence. Despite being a non-EU player, Dianda eligible to sign by Italian club because Dianda previously did not have any football education outside Italy. Hellas Verona F.C. offered him a contract before 10 August 2006 and tried to appeal to FIGC in order to make him eligible before that date but failed.

Dianda made his first team debut in 2006–07 Serie B, on 11 November 2006. In January 2007, Dianda left for Swiss Challenge League club Lugano. Verona relegated at the end of season. In January 2008 Dianda left for Serie C2 club Vibonese. Dianda only played 4 games in 2008–09 Lega Pro Prima Divisione.

In August 2009 he left for Sangiovannese. Co-currently Davide Bertolucci left for Verona. In August 2010 Dianda left for S.S. Juve Stabia in temporary deal and signed a new 2-year contract with Verona.

On 31 August 2011 Dianda was signed by Ternana. The club won Lega Pro Prima Divisione Group B but losing to Group A champion Spezia in the grand final of the league. At the end of season he was signed in co-ownership deal.

On 21 June 2013 Ternana acquired him outright. On 29 July 2015 he signed a new 1-year contract with club.

In September 2019, Dianda joined ASD Ferentillo-Valnerina.

International career
He was the captain of the Burkina Faso national under-20 football team. He was in the squad for 2007 African Youth Championship.

Honours
 Lega Pro Prima Divisione: 2012 (Ternana)
 Coppa Italia Lega Pro: 2011 (Juve Stabia)

References

External links
 
 
 
 Football.it Profile 

1987 births
People from Adzopé
Living people
Citizens of Burkina Faso through descent
Burkinabé footballers
Burkina Faso international footballers
Association football midfielders
Hellas Verona F.C. players
FC Lugano players
U.S. Vibonese Calcio players
A.S.D. Sangiovannese 1927 players
S.S. Juve Stabia players
Ternana Calcio players
A.S. Martina Franca 1947 players
S.S.D. Correggese Calcio 1948 players
Serie B players
Serie C players
Serie D players
Swiss Super League players
Expatriate footballers in Italy
Expatriate footballers in Switzerland
Burkinabé expatriate sportspeople in Italy
Burkinabé expatriate sportspeople in Switzerland
Ivorian people of Burkinabé descent
Sportspeople of Burkinabé descent
Burkinabé expatriate footballers
21st-century Burkinabé people
Burkina Faso under-20 international footballers